Free Beer was a Canadian comedic musical duo, consisting of Newfoundland entertainer Kevin Blackmore  and  Lorne Elliott, who hails from Montreal.

History
The duo was formed in 1979, and toured throughout eastern Canada, from Newfoundland to Montreal, performing in bars and on university campuses.

Among their comedic performances was an operatic arrangement of "I'se the Bye".

The pair separated in 1982. Blackmore soon established a new group, Buddy Wasisname and the Other Fellers, performing Newfoundland music and comedy.

Lorne Elliott became the lead performer in CBC's comedy show Madly Off in All Directions.

Discography

Albums
Clueless (1982)

References

External links
https://web.archive.org/web/20081006171325/http://www.buddywasisname.com/kevin.htm

Musical groups established in 1979
Musical groups disestablished in 1982
Musical groups from Newfoundland and Labrador
Canadian comedy musical groups
Canadian folk music groups
Canadian comedy duos
Canadian musical duos